Theodore Frelinghuysen Jewell (August 5, 1844 – July 26, 1932) was a rear admiral of the United States Navy.

Naval career
Jewell was appointed an acting midshipman on November 29, 1861, when he entered the United States Naval Academy. His class of 1865 graduated early on November 22, 1864. He served on the USS Colorado, at the Naval Observatory in Washington, D.C., and at the U.S. Naval Academy.  During the Civil War while still at the Naval Academy, in the summer of 1863 when the nation's capital was threatened by General Robert E. Lee's forces, he was in command of a fleet of howitzers at the US Naval Yard for the defense of Washington, D.C. 

A riot occurred on election day and marines and sailors from the Tuscarora and the USS Portsmouth landed to restore order.

In 1879 he was executive officer of the frigate . From January 1893 to February 1896 he was superintendent of the Naval Gun Factory at the Washington Navy Yard.

Jewell served with Admiral Dewey at the Battle of Manila Bay and later commanded the European squadron of the American Fleet in March 1904 when he was made a rear admiral. He retired in November 1904.

Dates of rank
Midshipman: July 16, 1862
Ensign: November 1, 1866
Lieutenant: March 12, 1868
Lieutenant Commander: March 26, 1869
Commander: January 26, 1885
Captain: February 1, 1898
Rear Admiral: March 15, 1904

Person life
He was the son of Thomas and Eleanor (Spencer) Jewell, born in Washington, D.C., on August 5, 1844.  On June 15, 1871, he married Elizabeth Lindsay Poor, daughter of rear admiral Charles Henry Poor. They had one son Commander Charles T. Jewell (1872–1929).

Admiral Jewell died July 26, 1932, at his residence in Washington, D.C. He was buried in Arlington National Cemetery.

Gallery

References

 T.F. Jewell, "The United States Naval Gun Factory", Harpers Monthly, Vol 89, Issue 530, July 1894, pp. 251–261.
 The Morgan Report, the US Senate investigation into the events surrounding the Hawaiian Revolution of 1893.

External links
 Summary of Jewell's Testimony - The Morgan Report at morganreport.org
 Cornell University Making of America at cdl.library.cornell.edu

1844 births
1932 deaths
Union Navy officers
American military personnel of the Spanish–American War
United States Navy rear admirals
United States Naval Academy alumni
Burials at Arlington National Cemetery
People from Washington, D.C.
People of Washington, D.C., in the American Civil War